Niklas Astedt (born 21 October 1990) is a Swedish professional poker player from Gothenburg, Sweden.

Career

Astedt began playing poker in 2008. Playing under the name Lena900 on PokerStars, he has more than $22 million in career online cashes, the second-most all-time as of May 2021.

Astedt has won three World Championship of Online Poker (WCOOP) and five Spring Championship of Online Poker (SCOOP) events. His largest online cash came in April 2021, when he won the GGPoker Super Millions for $1.1 million. He has been No. 1 on the PocketFives online poker rankings for 97 weeks, the most of any player, including 33 consecutive weeks from May 2018 to January 2019. He was the PocketFives player of the year in both 2018 and 2019.

In July 2020, Astedt finished runner-up to Roberto Romanello in a $1,500 No Limit Hold'em event in the World Series of Poker Online on GGPoker.

A poll conducted by PocketFives in May 2021 named Astedt the best online poker player in history.

In live poker, Astedt has more than $1.2 million in career earnings. His largest cash came in a $10,000 High Roller at EPT Barcelona in August 2015, where he finished fourth for €336,700.

WCOOP titles

SCOOP titles

References

External links
Hendon Mob profile
PocketFives profile
WSOP profile

1990 births
Swedish poker players
Living people